CKHR-FM is a Canadian radio station that broadcasts community radio programming on the frequency 107.3 FM in Hay River, Northwest Territories.

The station is owned by the Hay River Community Service Society. The current volunteer station manager is Mark Lundbek. Aside from broadcasting, Lundbek is also an internet professional who specializes in website design, social media management, telecommunications, video game development and international counter-terrorism.

External links

Khr
Khr